Ithaca Downtown Historic District is a national historic district located at Ithaca in Tompkins County, New York. The district consists of 64 contributing mostly commercial buildings. It is composed mainly of multi-story buildings with brick exteriors and flat or low-pitched roofs fronted by a variety of parapets set off by decorative cornices.  The district includes three separately listed properties: Clinton House, Clinton Hall, and the State Theater.

It was listed on the National Register of Historic Places in 2005.

References

Historic districts on the National Register of Historic Places in New York (state)
Historic districts in Tompkins County, New York
Buildings and structures in Ithaca, New York
National Register of Historic Places in Tompkins County, New York